University of Nottingham Futsal is a futsal club based at the University of Nottingham, Nottinghamshire, England. It competes in the FA National Futsal Super League, the highest standard of futsal in England.

History

The club was founded in July 2012 after a meeting between Martyn Ware, Daniel Slater and James Moore. After success in university competitions, the club entered the FA National Futsal League in 2013/14 in North Division 2. After a couple of competitive years, the club was selected as an elite group of 16 clubs to make up the 2015/16 FA National Futsal Super League. Shortly after, the club was nominated for the BUCS University Club of the Year.

Results

The club's final league positions in the FA National Futsal League are listed below

Venue 

The club currently plays its FA National Futsal League matches at Sutton Bonington Sports Centre, in Leicestershire. From season 2015/16, the club will be moving into the newly constructed £40m David Ross Sports Village, at University Park, Nottingham.

Teams 

The club is one of the largest in the country, catering for a wide demographic of players. Whilst initially launched with a single male students' team, it has grown to have four men's students' teams, three women's students' teams, an FA National Futsal League team and an Academy for youth players.

References

Futsal clubs in England
Sport in Nottingham
Futsal
Futsal clubs established in 2012
2012 establishments in England